The Lamborghini Sián FKP 37 is a mid-engine hybrid sports car produced by the Italian automotive manufacturer Lamborghini. Unveiled online on 3 September 2019, the Sián is the first hybrid production vehicle produced by the brand.

Nomenclature
The name Sián comes from a Bolognese word which means a flash of lightning. The name was selected to highlight the fact that the car is the first production vehicle produced by the company to include a hybrid supercapacitator component. The suffix FKP 37 is related to the initials and birth year of the late Volkswagen Group chairman Ferdinand Karl Piëch.

Specifications and performance
Based on the Lamborghini Aventador, the Sián FKP 37 shares its engine with the SVJ variant of the Aventador, but an electric motor integrated into the gearbox adds another 25 kW to the power output. Other modifications to the engine include the addition of titanium intake valves, a reconfigured ECU and a new exhaust system raising the power output to 785 PS. The total power output is 819 PS, making the Sián the most powerful production Lamborghini. The engine is connected to a 7-speed automated manual transmission and the car employs an electronically controlled all-wheel-drive system with a rear mechanical self-locking differential for improved handling.

The power for the electric motor is stored in a supercapacitor unit instead of conventional lithium-ion batteries. The supercapacitor unit is integrated with the electric motor into the gearbox in order for a better weight distribution. Supercapacitors were chosen due to their ability to provide three times the power of a conventional lithium-ion battery of the same weight. The unit installed in the car is an evolution of the Aventador's starter motor and can store ten times more power than the unit it is based on. A regenerative braking system helps generate enough energy to recharge the supercapacitors. The motor supports low-speed manoeuvres such as parking and reversing.

Design

The exterior design incorporates a wedge shape, a trademark of famed automobile designer Marcello Gandini and mixes that with the design of the Terzo Millennio concept introduced two years prior. The Y shaped daytime running headlights are inspired by the Terzo Millennio while at the rear an active fixed rear wing with the number "63" embossed on its winglets to honour the company's year of incorporation creates downforce. Downforce is maximised by the model's prominent side air intakes and large carbon-fibre front splitter. A transparent "Peroscopio" glass panel runs from the centre of the roof and rolls back into the slatted engine cover adds light and visibility for the occupants, and the six hexagonal taillights are an inspiration from the Countach.

Along with the wing, active cooling vanes at the rear are used which are activated by a smart material that reacts to heat. When a certain temperature is reached, the vanes rotate for extra airflow.
The interior is based heavily on the Aventador's interior, but the centre console has been tidied up and a portrait touchscreen first seen in the Huracán Evo is one of the key differences. The leather upholstery has been done by Poltrona Frau, an Italian furniture company and 3D printed parts are used on the interior for the first time.

Production 
Production of the Sián FKP 37 will be limited to 63 units of the coupe and 19 units of the roadster and all have already been sold. Lamborghini's Ad Personam division will be responsible for the manufacture of the Sián. The car was officially unveiled to the public at the 2019 Frankfurt Motor Show configured in a unique "electric gold" paint. It was also renamed to be known as the Sián FKP 37 honouring late Volkswagen Group chairman Ferdinand Piëch. "FKP" are the initials of his name and "37" are the last two numbers of his birth year (i.e. 1937).

Sián FKP 37 Roadster 

In July 2020, Lamborghini unveiled the convertible roadster version of the Sián. The car was launched in a new colour called Uranus Blue and is limited to 19 units, all of which have been already sold. Mechanically, the Roadster is similar to the coupe retaining the same engine and the supercapacitor hybrid system. At the rear, the car features 3D printed carbon fibre air vents on which the buyers can add their initials making each car unique.

Replica 
A replica of this model, made from construction bricks, was presented by Lego at the 2022 Paris Motor Show, although Lamborghini was not present at the event.

See also 

 List of production cars by power output

References

Cars introduced in 2019
Coupés
Flagship vehicles
Sian
Rear mid-engine, all-wheel-drive vehicles
Hybrid electric vehicles
Vehicles with four-wheel steering
Sports cars